South Atlantic English is a variety of the English language which is spoken on islands in the Southern hemisphere. South Atlantic English is spoken on Tristan da Cunha and Saint Helena, but its spread on other islands is unknown. An intelligibility with British English, a linguistic variety of the same country, exists. There are fewer than 10,000 speakers of South Atlantic English. South Atlantic English does not have official status anywhere.

References
Daniel Schreier, Peter Trudgill. The Lesser-Known Varieties of English: An Introduction. Cambridge University Press, Mar 4, 2010 pg. 10
 Tristan da Cunha: History, People, Language by Daniel Schreier and Karen Lavarello-Schreier (2003, Battlebridge, 88 pages).

Dialects of English
Saint Helena, Ascension and Tristan da Cunha culture